Eastern Suburbs, an electoral district of the Legislative Assembly in the Australian state of New South Wales was created in 1920 and abolished in 1927.


Election results

Elections in the 1920s

1925

1922

1920 appointment
James Fingleton died on 13 October 1920. Between 1920 and 1927 the Legislative Assembly was elected using a form of proportional representation with multi-member seats and a single transferable vote (modified Hare-Clark). There was confusion at the time as to the process to be used to fill the vacancy. When George Beeby resigned on 9 August 1920, in accordance with the practice prior to 1920, the Speaker of the Legislative Assembly issued a writ of election requiring a by-election to be conducted, however the Chief Electoral Officer said he couldn't do so under then law at the time and that a by-election would be contrary to the principle of proportional representation. The vacancies were left unfilled until the Parliament passed the Parliamentary Elections (Casual Vacancies) Act on 10 December 1920, so that casual vacancies were filled by the next unsuccessful candidate on the incumbent member's party list. Scott Campbell had been the first unsuccessful candidate at the 1920 election nominated by the Labor Party, however his endorsement, as well as that of Patrick Minahan was withdrawn before the polling day because he signed a pledge for the unconditional release of twelve imprisoned members of the Industrial Workers of the World. The Labor party decided that the first unsuccessful party candidate was Daniel Dwyer, and he took his seat on 15 December 1920.

1920

Notes

References

New South Wales state electoral results by district